Yuji Nunokawa (11 February 1947 – 25 December 2022) was a Japanese anime producer, animator and director.

Life and career 
Born in Sakata, Yamagata to a family of tailors, Nunokawa studied at the Nippon Design Welfare College, graduating in 1967. He made his professional debut as a colorist for an Eiken subsidiary. He then worked as a freelancer animator and a technical director at several anime production companies, notably Mushi Production and Tatsunoko Production. He was key animator for Robotan, and he made his directorial debut in 1975 with the series Time Bokan. 

In 1979 Nunokawa decided to establish his own company, and founded Studio Pierrot, which in a few years got a string of successes, including Kimagure Orange Road, Naruto, YuYu Hakusho, Bleach, Tokyo Ghoul. He also served as chairman of  the Association of Japanese Animations from 2009 to 2014. 

He died on 25 December 2022, at the age of 75.

References

External links

1947 births
2022 deaths
People from Yamagata Prefecture
Anime directors
Japanese anime producers 
Japanese animators
Recipients of the Medal with Blue Ribbon